Jiří Beran (born 18 January 1952) is a Czech cross-country skier. He competed at the 1976 Winter Olympics and the 1980 Winter Olympics.

References

External links
 

1952 births
Living people
Czech male cross-country skiers
Olympic cross-country skiers of Czechoslovakia
Cross-country skiers at the 1976 Winter Olympics
Cross-country skiers at the 1980 Winter Olympics
People from Náchod
Sportspeople from the Hradec Králové Region